Unser Bier is a small local brewery in Basel, Switzerland.

Unser Bier is most widely known for its amber beer, a simple lager. They also produce a wheat beer (Weizen) and a pale ale (Natur Blond) and a dark porter style beer (Schwarz Bier), as well as a number of specialty and seasonal beers such as a Christmas beer and the "Meister" beer, produced when the FC Basel football team wins the national championship. 2010 the brewery moved to the Gundeldinger Feld and invested 5 million Swiss francs to enlarge its capacity and for a new bottling station. 

On May 6, 2006, Unser Bier become the biggest brewery in Basel following the merger of Ziegelhof with Eichhof.

References

External links
 Company website

Beer in Switzerland